Staphylococcus argenteus are gram-positive cocci from the genus Staphylococcus which have been isolated from blood culture of a 55-year-old Indigenous Australian female in 2006 in Darwin, Northern Territory, Australia. The species is close related to S. aureus and the differentiation is challenging. Staphylococcus argenteus is cytotoxic to human cells due to high expression of alpha-hemolysin.

References

argenteus
Bacteria described in 2015